Events in the year 2001 in Ukraine.

Incumbents 

 President: Leonid Kuchma
 Prime Minister: Viktor Yushchenko (until 29 May), Anatoliy Kinakh (from 29 May)

Events 

 5 December – The Ukrainian Census of 2001, the first census of the population of independent Ukraine, was conducted by the State Statistics Committee of Ukraine.

Births 
 Mykhailo Mudryk, footballer (5 January)

Deaths 
 Viktor Bannikov, football player and official (25 April)
 Mykhailo Bilyi, politician (5 August)

References 

 
Ukraine
Ukraine
2000s in Ukraine
Years of the 21st century in Ukraine